Sofie Schjøtt (11 August 1871 – 20 January 1950) was a Norwegian jurist.

Early life 
She was born in Aker to Peter Olrog Schjøtt and Mathilde Dunker. She was a granddaughter of Bernhard Dunker, and a great-granddaughter of Conradine Birgitte Dunker.

Career 
Schjøtt was among the first female jurists in Norway. She had a long career in the Ministry of Defence, and was later a judge in Oslo.

References

1871 births
1950 deaths
Judges from Oslo